Boonville Township is one of twelve townships in Yadkin County, North Carolina, United States. The township had a population of 3,883, according to the 2000 census.

Geographically, Boonville Township occupies  in northern Yadkin County.  Boonville Township's northern border is the Yadkin River.  The only incorporated municipality within Boonville Township is the Town of Boonville.

Townships in Yadkin County, North Carolina
Townships in North Carolina